Bolesław  is a village in Olkusz County, Lesser Poland Voivodeship, in southern Poland. It is the seat of the gmina (administrative district) called Gmina Bolesław.

The village has a population of 2,500.

International relations

Twin towns – Sister cities
Bolesław has a partnership with:
  Bergamo, Italy

References

Villages in Olkusz County